Sheikh Khalid bin Mohammed Al Qasimi (1931—1972) was ruler of the Emirate of Sharjah, United Arab Emirates from 1965 until his assassination in 1972.

Biography
Sheikh Khalid acceded as Ruler of Sharjah following the exile of his cousin, Sheikh Saqr bin Sultan Al Qasimi, who was removed as Ruler of Sharjah with the unanimous consent of the ruling family, under pressure from the British. His status as Ruler was confirmed by William Luce, the British political resident in Bahrain, on 25 June 1965. A quiet and unassuming man, Khalid first established a formal police force in Sharjah and was also to play a key role as a participant in the negotiations and agreements which gave rise to the foundation of the United Arab Emirates on 2 December 1971.

He was also responsible for the demolition of Sharjah Fort, in an attempt to extirpate the memory of Saqr. The demolition was interrupted by his brother, Sultan bin Muhammad Al-Qasimi, who saved many of the fixtures and made drawings of the building. Arriving too late to save most of the fort, he nevertheless persuaded his brother to cease the demolition. All that remained was a single tower, Al Qubs - also called the 'Bourj'. Some twenty years later, Sheikh Sultan had the fort completely - and faithfully - restored.

On 24 January 1972, Saqr returned to Sharjah from Egypt, where he had been exiled, with a number of mercenaries and seized power in an attempted coup. The group invaded the Ruler's palace at approximately 2.30 pm, with reports of gunfire and grenade explosions within the palace grounds. Besieged by the Union Defence Force, which arrived an hour later, Saqr finally gave himself up in the early hours of 25 January to UAE Minister of Defence, Sheikh Mohammed bin Rashid Al Maktoum. However, Sheikh Khalid was killed in the action.

Sheikh Khalid was succeeded as Ruler of Sharjah by his brother, Sheikh Sultan bin Muhammad Al-Qasimi.

References

20th-century murdered monarchs
1931 births
1972 deaths
House of Al Qasimi
Sheikhs of the Emirate of Sharjah